Thomas Blug, born in Saarbrücken in 1966, is a German musician, guitarist, musical electronic engineer and composer. He also formed his own band Thomas Blug Band with whom he released three albums besides his solo albums. He has also worked with band Dreist with whom he released an album in 1997 and a live album a decade later.

In 2014, he launched his own company, Bluguitar, which produces guitar, amplifiers, cabs and effects units.

Discography

Albums
Solo
1996: The Beauty of Simplicity
1998: Electric Gallery
2002: 21st Century Guitar
2011: Blug plays Hendrix (Live album)
2012: Thomas Blug – Best of (Compilation album CD)

 with Thomas Blug Band
2005: Guitar from the Hear (Live album + DVD)
2005: Guitar from the Heart – Live in Raalte, NL (Live album)
2009: Soul & Pepper

with band Dreist
1997: Weiber
2007: Neue Zeit (Live album)

Singles

Awards
1997 "Best German Rock and Pop Guitarist"
2004 "Fender Strat(r) King of Europe"

References

External links
Official website
Stratking award information
Article on Thomas Blug

1966 births
Living people
German composers
German guitarists
German male guitarists
People from Saarbrücken
Musicians from Saarland